Las Plumas (Spanish for "The Feathers";  "feather") is a former settlement in Butte County, California.

Geography
It is now flooded by Lake Oroville.

Climate
This region experiences warm (but not hot) and dry summers, with no average monthly temperatures above 71.6 °F.  According to the Köppen Climate Classification system, Las Plumas has a warm-summer Mediterranean climate, abbreviated "Csb" on climate maps.

History
A post office operated in Las Plumas from 1908 to 1967, with a closure from 1909 to 1912. Its location on the Feather River gave the place its translated into Spanish name. The town was located in the Feather River canyon, but was evacuated and flooded when Oroville Dam was built. Most former residents now live in nearby Oroville.

References

External links

Former settlements in Butte County, California
Feather River
Former populated places in California
Destroyed towns
Submerged settlements in the United States
1908 establishments in California